Emoia is a genus of skinks, lizards in the subfamily Eugongylinae. The genus Emoia belongs to a group of genera mainly from the southwestern Pacific-Australian region. 

These small skinks are commonly known as emoias or skinks.

Species
List of 78 valid Emoia species and their respective authors, geographical ranges, and common names from the Reptile Database:

Nota bene: A binomial authority in parentheses indicates that the species was originally described in a genus other than Emoia.

References

 
Lizard genera
Taxa named by John Edward Gray